Fairfax William Cartwright (14 May 1823 – 2 February 1881) was an academic, soldier and Conservative politician who sat in the House of Commons from 1868 to 1881.

Cartwright was the eldest son of  Lieutenant-General William Cartwright of Flore House, Weedon, Northamptonshire and his wife Mary Anne Jones, only daughter and heiress of Henry Jones. He was educated at Christ Church, Oxford  where he graduated B.A. in  1844, and subsequently became a Fellow of All Souls. He served in the Austrian Army for a while, and was later major in the  2nd Hussars British German Legion which was raised for service in the Crimean War. He was a J.P. and a Deputy Lieutenant of Northamptonshire.

At the 1868 general election, Cartwright was elected as Member of Parliament (MP) for South Northamptonshire and held the seat until his death in 1881, unmarried.  He was one of the most active campaigners for police superannuation.

References

External links 

1823 births
1881 deaths
Alumni of Christ Church, Oxford
Fellows of All Souls College, Oxford
Conservative Party (UK) MPs for English constituencies
UK MPs 1868–1874
UK MPs 1874–1880
UK MPs 1880–1885
People from Weedon Bec
Deputy Lieutenants of Northamptonshire
Members of the Privy Council of the United Kingdom